Blue Ridge Mountain, also known as Blue Mountain, is the colloquial name of the westernmost ridge of the Blue Ridge Mountains in northern Virginia and the Eastern Panhandle of West Virginia. The Appalachian Trail traverses the entire length of the mountain along its western slope and crest.

Geography
The mountain extends from the Potomac River in the north to Linden Gap in the south. Along this section of the Blue Ridge Mountains, Blue Ridge Mountain comprises the sole ridge of the chain in the immediate vicinity and contains few spur ridges or peaks. To the west of the mountain is the lower Shenandoah Valley.

Blue Ridge Mountain is noticeably lower in elevation than other sections of the Blue Ridge Mountains in Virginia. The southern section of the mountain contains the highest peaks, and the ridge gradually loses elevation as it gets closer to the Potomac. Across the Potomac the ridge continues as Elk Ridge in Maryland.

The mountain's ridgecrest forms the border between several counties, with Loudoun County and Fauquier County, both in Virginia, to the east and Jefferson County, West Virginia, Clarke County, Virginia, and Warren County, Virginia, to the west.

Geology
Blue Ridge Mountain consists mostly of anticlinal Catoctin Greenstone and is not underlain by Old Rag Granite, as is the Blue Ridge south of Manassas Gap. This is why the mountain is more ridgelike and less rugged than sections to the south. The greenstone was deposited during the Catoctin Formation and uplifted during the Alleghenian Orogeny.

Recreation
Blue Ridge Mountain contains several national, state, regional and private parks that offer recreational opportunities on the mountain including:
Harpers Ferry National Historical Park
Blue Ridge Center for Environmental Stewardship
Rolling Ridge Foundation
Sky Meadows State Park
G. Richard Thompson Wildlife Management Area

Notable peaks
North to south:
Loudoun Heights
Purcell Knob
Raven Rocks
Mount Weather
Paris Mountain

Notable gaps
North to south:
Keyes Gap
Wilson Gap
Snickers Gap
Ashby Gap
Manassas Gap

References

Ridges of Virginia
Ridges of West Virginia
Mountains of Loudoun County, Virginia
Mountains of Jefferson County, West Virginia
Blue Ridge Mountains
Mountains of Clarke County, Virginia
Mountains of Fauquier County, Virginia
Mountains of Warren County, Virginia